Parens chekiangi is a moth of the family Erebidae first described by Michael Fibiger in 2011. It is found in China (it was described from Zhejiang).

The wingspan is about 9.5 mm. The forewings are yellowish brown with a brown terminal area and fringes. There are six black costal dots. The crosslines are brown and rather indistinct, except the terminal line which is marked with black interveinal dots. The fringes are grey brown. The hindwings are grey throughout with an indistinct discal spot. The underside of the forewings is unicolorous brown, with three light yellow subapical spots on the costa. The underside of the hindwings is light grey with a discal spot.

References

Micronoctuini
Moths described in 2011